Long Hill is a historic home overlooking Wetipquin Creek in Wetipquin, Wicomico County, Maryland, United States. It was built about 1767 and is a five bay wide wood panelled and brick house set on a brick foundation laid in Flemish bond.  It is an essentially untouched Maryland dwelling, dating from the second half of the 18th century. The house is associated with the Dashiell family, several of whom took an active part in the affairs of the colony.

Long Hill was listed on the National Register of Historic Places in 1974.

References

External links

, including undated photo, at Maryland Historical Trust

Houses in Wicomico County, Maryland
Houses on the National Register of Historic Places in Maryland
Houses completed in 1767
1767 establishments in Maryland
National Register of Historic Places in Wicomico County, Maryland